Aluminium glycinate (or dihydroxyaluminium aminoacetate) is an antacid.

See also
 Aceglutamide

References

Antacids
Aluminium compounds
Glycinates